Paul Koulak (born Paul Koulaksezian; 27 March 1943 – 28 June 2021) was a French composer of Armenian origin.

Biography 
Koulak was born in Saint-Chamond.

Two of his three brothers are also in the artistic field, one being also a musician, the other, an actor.

He studied music at the École Normale de Musique de Paris and the Conservatoire de Paris. He has composed many pieces of music for television: broadcasts of game shows and in particular the most famous, those of the credits of Fort Boyard (a program for which he composed nearly 200 pieces) in its first version from 1990 and credits for cartoons.

In 1971, Koulak composed the music for the song "Souviens-toi de moi" for the singer Marie and in 1973 "Sans toi" which was performed by Martine Clémenceau for the Eurovision Song Contest 1973.

In 1989 Koulak composed Canal+ sports advertising and also Météo, the weather forecast on Antenne 2, during this period.

All his compositions are played on synthesizers.

Discography
TV series

1985: Clémentine
1989: Operation Mozarts
1990–2013: Fort Boyard (soundtrack) 
1992: La Piste de Xapatan
1992: Le Vol du Kangourou
1992: Civilisation in Danger
1998: Tom-Tom and Nana
1999: La Belle Lisse Poire du Prince de Motordu

References

External links 
 
 
 

1943 births
2021 deaths
People from Saint-Chamond
20th-century French composers
Conservatoire de Paris alumni
École Normale de Musique de Paris alumni
French male composers
20th-century French male musicians
French people of Armenian descent